You Can All Join In is a budget priced sampler album, released in the UK by Island Records in 1968.  It was priced at 14 shillings and 6 pence (£0.72), and reached no. 18 on the UK Albums Chart that year. 

It was arguably instrumental in breaking world-class bands such as Free, Jethro Tull and Traffic to a wider audience.  The album is described at Allmusic.com as:

It was combined with the follow-up, Nice Enough To Eat for a CD Re-release in August 1992 entitled Nice Enough To Join In (Island Records IMCD 150).

Track listing
Side one
"A Song for Jeffrey" (Ian Anderson) – Jethro Tull – (Alternative mix, original version from This Was) (ILPS 9085)
"Sunshine Help Me" (Gary Wright) – Spooky Tooth – (from It’s All About Spooky Tooth) (ILPS 9080)
"I’m a Mover" (Paul Rodgers, Andy Fraser) – Free – (from  Tons of Sobs) (ILPS 9089)
"What’s That Sound" (Stephen Stills) – Art – (from Supernatural Fairy Tales) (ILP 967)
"Pearly Queen" (Steve Winwood, Jim Capaldi) – Tramline – (from Moves of Vegetable Centuries) (ILPS 9095)
"You Can All Join In" (Dave Mason) – Traffic – (from Traffic) (ILPS 9081T)

Side two
"Meet on the Ledge" (Richard Thompson) – Fairport Convention – (from What We Did on Our Holidays) (ILPS 9092)
"Rainbow Chaser" (Alex Spyropoulos, Patrick Campbell-Lyons) – Nirvana – (from All of Us) (ILPS 9087)
"Dusty" – (Martyn) - John Martyn – (from The Tumbler) (ILPS 9091)
"I’ll Go Girl" (Billy Ritchie, Ian Ellis, Harry Hughes) –  Clouds – (from Scrapbook) (ILPS 9100)
"Somebody Help Me" (Jackie Edwards) – Spencer Davis Group – (from The Best of the Spencer Davis Group) (ILPS 9070)
"Gasoline Alley" (Mick Weaver) – Wynder K. Frog – (from Out of the Frying Pan) (ILPS 9082)

The album cover
Designed by Hipgnosis and although not as imaginative as some of their later work, the front cover photograph was taken in Hyde Park and is said to feature "every single one of the Island artistes ... bleary eyed after a party." The rear cover consists merely of a track listing and monochrome images of the covers of eight of the sampled albums (Tracks 1.1, 1.2, 1.4, 1.6, 2.1, 2.2, 2.3 & 2.6).

Artists shown

References

External links
  The Original Mixed-Up Label: Island Records Sampler Albums
Sampler albums
Albums with cover art by Hipgnosis
1969 compilation albums
Rock compilation albums
Island Records compilation albums